The Miss Nicaragua 2006 pageant, was held on March 4, 2006 in Managua, after several weeks of events.  At the conclusion of the final night of competition, Cristiana Frixione from Managua won the title. She represented Nicaragua at Miss Universe 2006 held in Los Angeles later that year. The rest of the finalists would enter different pageants.

Placements

Special awards

 Miss Photogenic - Tipitapa - Rosalba Mejia
 Best Hair - Managua - Cristiana Frixione
 Best Smile - Jinotega - Silvia Flores
 Most Beautiful Face - Managua - Cristiana Frixione
 Miss Congeniality - Nueva Segovia - Marjorie Tercero
 Miss Fitness - Managua - Cristiana Frixione

.

Official Contestants

Judges

 Marinelly Rivas Blanco - President of National Tourism Institute
 Miguel de la Torre - Fashion Designer
 Alejandro Bolanos - Director of Center for Leadership and Cultural Transformation  "El Laurel"
 Sheyla Santos - Nicaraguan Goldsmith
 Theresa Pellas -  Co-Founder of AFN (American Nicaraguan Foundation)
 Alejandro Sanchez -  Executive Director of  Las Brumas Urbanization
 Raul Ortiz -  General Manager of UNILEVER Nicaragua S.A
 Ivan Diaz -  General Manager of AMANCO Nicaragua S.A
 Julia Hopping - Co-Founder of the Foundation Futuro De Nicaragua

Background Music

Opening Show – Diego Torres - "Sueños"
Swimsuit Competition - Touch & Go - "Would You Go To Bed With Me"
Evening Gown Competition – Bond - "Explosive"

.

Special Guests
 Mario Sacasa - "Quiero Maria"

References

Miss Nicaragua
2006 in Nicaragua
2006 beauty pageants